Joseph Bercholz (1898–1981) was a Russian-born French film producer. In the 1930s he established the production company Les Films Gibé with Édouard Gide. During the Second World War he left for America where he produced a couple of films in Hollywood for Republic Pictures before returning to France to resume production.

Selected filmography
 Return at Dawn (1938)
 Gargousse (1938)
 Abused Confidence (1938)
 Nine Bachelors (1939)
 The Man Who Seeks the Truth (1940)
 Behind City Lights (1945)
 Steppin' in Society (1945)
 Pastoral Symphony (1946)
 Good Lord Without Confession (1953)
 Napoleon Road (1953)
 Elena and Her Men (1956)
 Marie Antoinette Queen of France (1956)
 Love Is at Stake (1957)
 Mandrin (1962)
 The Oldest Profession (1967)

References

Bibliography
 Crisp, C.G. The Classic French Cinema, 1930-1960. Indiana University Press, 1993.
 Temple, Michael & Witt, Michael. The French Cinema Book. Bloomsbury Publishing, l 2019.

External links

1898 births
1981 deaths
Russian film producers
French film producers
Emigrants from the Russian Empire to France
French emigrants to the United States